Aneika A. Henry (born February 13, 1986) is a Jamaican-Azerbaijani professional basketball player for OGM Orman Genclik Ankara of the Turkish Women's Basketball League..

Early life
Henry was born in Jamaica. She was 11 years old when she and her family moved to the United States and lived in Florida.

High school
Henry was a 2004 graduate of Coral Gables Senior High School, where she played basketball. Upon graduation, she became enrolled at Seminole.

College career
In the first two years of her college career, Henry attended Seminole State College of Florida and played for the school's team in the National Junior College Athletic Association. In 2007, Henry then attended the University of Florida after graduation from Seminole, playing for the school's team in the more mainstream exposed National Collegiate Athletic Association. During her two years with Florida, she had 8 double-figure scoring games, had 2 double-figure rebounding games and participated in the 2008 Slam Sunk Contest.

College statistics

Source

Professional career

WNBA
Henry entered the 2009 WNBA draft but went undrafted. She played the next 3 years overseas before playing on a WNBA team. In 2011, Henry had signed with the Seattle Storm to a training camp contract, but was waived before the season started. In 2012, Henry signed with the Atlanta Dream to a training camp contract. Following the training camp she made the final roster for the team, becoming the third Jamaican player in WNBA history. In her rookie season with the Dream, Henry played 34 games with 14 starts as a reserve, averaging 4.8 ppg and 4.1 rpg. During the season, Henry set a franchise record for most field goals made without a miss in a regular season game win against the Tulsa Shock, where she scored 14 points on 7 of 7 field goal shooting. In 2013, Henry re-signed with the Dream. During the 2013 season, Henry played 34 games with 1 start averaging 3.9 ppg and 3.9 rpg. The Dream made it all the way to the 2013 WNBA Finals but were swept by the Minnesota Lynx. In 2015, Henry re-signed once again to the Dream. In the 2015 season, Henry played 29 games with 11 starts and averaged a career-high in scoring but the Dream never made it to the playoffs. In 2016, Henry signed a 2-year contract with the Connecticut Sun. After playing 10 games in her first season with the Sun, Henry would miss the rest of the season while being listed as day-to-day, due to undisclosed health reasons. On January 26, 2017, Henry was traded back to the Dream in exchange for Reshanda Gray.

Overseas
Prior to her WNBA career, Henry played in Spain and Poland for CB Gran Canaria, Mann Filter Zaragoza and Lotos VBW Clima Gdynia from 2009 to 2012. In the 2012–13 off-season, Henry played in Spain for Rivas Ecopolis. In the 2013-14 off-season, played in Turkey for Hatay Büyükşehir Belediyesi. In the 2014-15 off-season, Henry played for Guangdong Dolphins in China. In the 2015-16 off-season, Henry played in Turkey once again for Mersin S.K. As of June 2016, Henry signed with Osmaniye Genclik of the Turkish League for the 2016-17 off-season. In 2017, Henry signed with Heilongjiang Shenda of the Chinese league for the 2017-18 off-season. In August 2018, Henry signed with OGM Orman Genclik Ankara of the Turkish League for 2018-19.

National team career
In 2015, Henry along with teammate Tiffany Hayes received Azerbaijani citizenship and competed for the Azerbaijan women's national basketball team at the 2015 European Games held in Baku, Azerbaijan.

WNBA statistics

Regular season 

|-
| style="text-align:left;"| 2012
| style="text-align:left;"| Atlanta
| 34 || 14 || 18.0 || .468 || .000 || .762 || 4.1 || 0.4 || 0.4 || 0.8 || 0.8 || 4.8
|-
| style="text-align:left;"| 2013
| style="text-align:left;"| Atlanta
| 34 || 1 || 12.8 || .450 || .000 || .765 || 3.9 ||0.5 || 0.2 || 0.5 || 0.7 || 3.9
|-
| style="text-align:left;"| 2014
| style="text-align:left;"| Atlanta
| 34 || 4 || 12.8 || .582 || .000 || .676 || 3.4 || 0.3 || 0.2 || 0.6 || 0.9 || 4.5
|-
| style="text-align:left;"| 2015
| style="text-align:left;"| Atlanta
| 29 || 11 || 17.9 || .485 || .000 || .750 || 4.7 || 0.4 || 0.3 ||  0.8 || 1.5 || 5.2
|-
| style="text-align:left;"| 2016
| style="text-align:left;"| Connecticut
| 10 || 2 || 5.0 || .385 || .000 || .400 || 1.4 || 0.2 || 0.1 || 0.1 || 0.6 || 1.2
|-
| style="text-align:left;"| 2017
| style="text-align:left;"| Atlanta
| 6 || 0 || 5.1 || .857 || .000 || .000 || 1.0 || 0.3 || 0.3 || 0.0 || 0.5 || 2.0
|-
| style="text-align:left;"| Career
| style="text-align:left;"|6 years, 2 teams
|147||32||14.2||.495||.000||.727||3.8||0.4||0.3||0.6||1.0||4.2

Playoffs

|- 
| style="text-align:left;"| 2012
| style="text-align:left;"| Atlanta
| 3 || 0 || 10.0 || .750 || .000 || 1.000 || 1.7 || 0.0 || 0.0 || 0.6 || 1.0 || 2.7
|-
| style="text-align:left;"| 2013
| style="text-align:left;"| Atlanta
| 8 || 3 || 22.7 || .550 || .000 || .833 || 6.6 || 0.3 || 0.6 || 0.8 || 0.8 || 6.1
|-
| style="text-align:left;"| 2014
| style="text-align:left;"| Atlanta
| 3|| 0 || 16.2 || .727 || .000 || .750 || 2.3 || 0.3 || 0.6 || 0.0 || 1.3 || 6.3
|-
| style="text-align:left;"| Career
| style="text-align:left;"|3 years, 1 team
|14||3||18.6||.600||.000||.833||4.6||0.2||0.5||0.6||1.0||5.4

See also
 List of Florida Gators in the WNBA
 List of University of Florida alumni

References

External links
 
 Aneika Henry at EuroLeague Women
 
 
 

1986 births
Living people
Antakya Belediyespor players
Atlanta Dream players
Jamaican women's basketball players
Azerbaijani women's basketball players
Jamaican emigrants to Azerbaijan
Naturalized citizens of Azerbaijan
European Games competitors for Azerbaijan
Basketball players at the 2015 European Games
Jamaican emigrants to the United States
Connecticut Sun players
Florida Gators women's basketball players
Jamaican expatriate basketball people in Turkey
Junior college women's basketball players in the United States
Undrafted Women's National Basketball Association players
Guangdong Vermilion Birds players
Heilongjiang Dragons players
Centers (basketball)
Power forwards (basketball)
American expatriate basketball people in Turkey
American expatriate basketball people in Poland
American expatriate basketball people in Spain
American expatriate basketball people in China
Jamaican expatriate basketball people in China
Jamaican expatriate basketball people in Spain
Jamaican expatriate basketball people in Poland
Basketball players from Florida
Azerbaijani expatriate basketball people in Turkey
Azerbaijani expatriate basketball people in China